The University of Galway is a public research university located in the city of Galway, Ireland. A tertiary education and research institution, the university was awarded the full five QS stars for excellence in 2012, and was ranked among the top 1 percent of universities in the 2018 QS World University Rankings.

The university was founded in 1845 as "Queen's College, Galway". It was known as "University College, Galway" (UCG) (Irish: Coláiste na hOllscoile, Gaillimh), until 1997 and as "National University of Ireland, Galway" (NUI Galway) (Irish: Ollscoil na hÉireann, Gaillimh; OÉ Gaillimh), until 2022. In late April 2022, it was announced that NUI Galway would be renamed "Ollscoil na Gaillimhe – University of Galway" in summer 2022, amid confusion over its proper title.

University of Galway is a member of the Coimbra Group, a network of 40 long-established European universities.

History
The university was established in 1845 as Queen's College, Galway, together with Queen's College, Cork, and Queen's College, Belfast. It opened for teaching on 30 October 1849 with 68 students. In 1850, it became part of the Queen's University of Ireland, and its degrees were conferred in the name of that university.

Located close to the city centre, the university campus stretches along the River Corrib. The oldest part of the university, the Quadrangle with its Aula Maxima, was designed by John Benjamin Keane in a Tudor Gothic architectural style and was constructed from local limestone; it is a replica of Christ Church, one of the colleges at the University of Oxford.

After the passing of the University Education (Ireland) Act 1879, the Queen's University was dissolved on 3 February 1882, and was replaced by the Royal University of Ireland, which had been established on 27 April 1880.

With the passing of the Irish Universities Act 1908, the Royal University of Ireland was dissolved and was replaced by the National University of Ireland and the Queen's University of Belfast. The name of Queen's College, Galway, was changed to University College, Galway, and it became a constituent college of the new National University of Ireland, together with University College, Dublin, and University College, Cork. Queen's College, Belfast, became an independent university, called the Queen's University of Belfast. University College, Galway (UCG), was given special statutory responsibility under the University College Galway Act 1929 with respect of the use of the Irish language as a working language of the university.

Several new buildings were constructed on the university campus in the 1970s and were designed by architects Scott Tallon Walker. The 1990s also saw considerable development, including the conversion of an old munitions factory into a student centre. Under the early 21st-century Presidency of Iognáid G. Ó Muircheartaigh, the university announced details of plans to make the university a "campus of the future" at a cost of around €400 million. Ó Muircheartaigh's successor James J. Browne continued and implemented that plan.

With the passing of the Universities Act 1997, the name of University College Galway was changed to National University of Ireland, Galway and it became a university in its own right, as a constituent university of the National University of Ireland. The university had hoped to change its name to University of Galway, but had received legal advice that this was not possible under the provisions of the Act.

Visiting the university in 2003, on what was to be his last visit to Ireland, Nelson Mandela condemned U.S. foreign policy and received an honorary doctorate from NUI Chancellor Garret FitzGerald.

In 2008, Minister for Community, Equality and Gaeltacht Affairs Éamon Ó Cuív and a student became involved in an altercation on the grounds of the university. In 2009, former Taoiseach Bertie Ahern was forced to flee from a public discussion at the university after being jostled by students opposed to the planned reintroduction of college fees. 

21st-century developments include a state-of-the-art University Sports Centre (Ionad Spóirt), Áras Moyola, J.E. Cairnes School of Business & Economics, the Alice Perry Engineering Building, the BioSciences Research Building, the Life Course Institute, the Lambe Institute and the O'Donoghue Centre for Drama, Theatre and Performance, and the Human Biology Building.

In 2014 the Equality Tribunal ruled in favor of Dr Micheline Sheehy Skeffington, granddaughter of the famous Irish feminist couple Hannah Sheehy Skeffington and Francis Sheehy Skeffington, who claimed she had been discriminated against on the grounds of gender during 2009.  The university "unreservedly" accepted the decision that the "hiring process was flawed". In 2015 with "widespread concern" among staff, mandatory unconscious bias training was introduced for senior staff, including heads of school and interview boards. In 2017 Dr Elizabeth Tilley was deemed to have exceeded qualifications for senior lectureship following a Labour Court hearing and promoted. In 2017, the gender ratio of senior lecturers in the university was 60:40 in favour of men. The ratio of professorships, the most senior academic grade, was 87:13 in favor of men. In 2018 the university achieved bronze status in the Athena SWAN recognises a commitment to advancing gender equality in higher education and research careers. In 2018 a further four female lecturers who had also applied for promotion in 2009 were promoted having settled their cases "amicably".

The university launched its Strategic Plan "Shared Vision, Shaped By Values" (for the period 2020–2025) in 2020. Also in 2020, the university was awarded €4 million from the EU's Horizon 2020 Research and Innovation programme to support its Solar2chem project.

On 1 September 2022, the university changed its name to University of Galway.

Colleges and schools
Up until 2007, the university was divided into seven faculties (Arts, Celtic Studies, Commerce, Law, Medicine and Health Sciences, and Science), which were further subdivided into some 69 departments. In 2007-2008, the university transitioned from the faculties and departments structure to a structure of five colleges divided into various schools.

The following are the current colleges and schools of the university:
 College of Arts, Social Sciences and Celtic Studies
 School of Political Science and Sociology
 School of Psychology
 School of Education
 School of Geography, Archaeology and Irish Studies
 School of English and Creative Arts
 School of History and Philosophy
 School of Languages, Literatures and Cultures
 Acadamh na hOllscolaíochta Gaeilge
 College of Medicine, Nursing and Health Sciences
 School of Health Sciences
 School of Medicine
 School of Nursing and Midwifery
 Adult Learning and Professional Development
 College of Business, Public Policy and Law
 JE Cairnes School of Business and Economics
 School of Law
 Shannon College of Hotel Management
 College of Science and Engineering
 School of Biological and Chemical Sciences
 School of Computer Science
 School of Engineering
 School of Mathematical and Statistical Sciences
 School of Natural Sciences
 School of Physics

Since January 2006, St. Angela's College, Sligo, has been a college of the University of Galway; St Angela's was previously a recognised college of the National University of Ireland. As a result, those admitted to St. Angela's College are registered as students of the University of Galway.

Since 2015 the Shannon College of Hotel Management has been fully incorporated into the university — becoming part of the College of Business, Public Policy & Law at Galway — formally marked by the then Minister for Education and Skills Jan O'Sullivan at an event held in Shannon College on 9 November 2015. All staff of Shannon College of Hotel Management became staff of the university and all students of Shannon College of Hotel Management became students of the university.

Research

There are five designated Research Institutes and a number of Research Centres and Units at the University of Galway. Designated Research Institutes at the university are characterised by significant interdisciplinary (generally cross-College) and high-quality research activity, including extensive collaboration nationally and internationally.
Examples of mould-breaking research include sugar coating devices and how spider bites can lead to hospitalisation.

Foundation
Galway University Foundation (GUF) was established in 1998 with the intention of generating financial support for the university from private individuals and institutions.  It nurtures relationships with donors for whom the university's approach to education appeals. The Foundation has many 'Priority Projects' in development.

The main library building of the University of Galway is named the James Hardiman Library after the library's first librarian, James Hardiman.

Student life

Societies
University of Galway has about 150 active student societies, ranging from the academic to artistic and performing, lifestyle and wellbeing, religious and political, social action and volunteering, social and cultural, and special interest.

The oldest society on the campus is the Literary and Debating Society, founded in 1846. Dramsoc (the university's drama society) was founded in 1914. Cumann Staire is one of Europe's oldest history societies, and is a member of Comhaltas na gCumann Staire and the International Students of History Association. The university's Fianna Fáil branch, Cumann de Barra, was founded in 1954, making it the oldest university political party branch in Ireland. Fine Gael's youth wing was founded in the university in 1973 during the Liam Cosgrave-led Fine Gael/Labour Coalition government, with Enda Kenny and Madeleine Taylor-Quinn among those behind its establishment there. Official Sinn Féin were also influential in campus politics in the 1970s, and Students Union Presidents Eamon Gilmore and Johnny Curran were party members. CompSoc (the university's computer society) is the oldest of its kind in the country, established in 1977.

Most of Ireland's main political parties have active societies at the university, including Fianna Fáil, Fine Gael, Green, Labour, People Before Profit, Sinn Féin and the Social Democrats. 

Flirt FM is a community radio station located on campus, spearheaded by the Radio Society.

GUMS, the university musical society, hosts annual musicals in the Dubhlann/Black Box Theatre.

In 2014, the Christian and LGBT societies were involved in a showdown over same-sex marriage. The incident was provoked by the auditor of the Christian Society, running for the position of Equality Officer in that year's student union election. Earlier, in the late part of 2013, the university suspended the Legion of Mary Society after it failed to satisfactorily explain its connection to posters containing information on a Christian support group for homosexual persons.

An Cumann Gaelach and An Cumann Drámaíochta are the university's main Irish language societies, following the demise of the Cumann Craic. One of the main events of the Cumann Gaelach is the yearly celebration of Seachtain na Gaeilge. The society was awarded the Best New Entry Award at the Glór na nGael awards in 2011.

Clubs
University of Galway has more than 40 sports clubs based on campus, ranging from indoor sports (such as archery, badminton, fencing, weightlifting, table tennis, and squash), to water sports (such as rowing, kayaking, sailing, windsurfing, and scuba diving), as well as martial arts (such as judo, karate, aikido, Muay Thai, kendo, and taekwondo), plus equestrian, triathlon, athletics, and snow sports.

The university also competes in the most popular Irish field sports of association football, Gaelic football, hurling, and rugby union, as well as cricket, hockey, and lacrosse.

NUI Galway GAA compete in the Sigerson Cup (Gaelic football) and the Fitzgibbon Cup (hurling). They are the second most prolific winners of the Sigerson Cup.

NUI Galway RFC compete in the Connacht Senior Cup, and are the competition's most successful side with 34 wins.

University of Galway FC compete in the Galway & District League, the CUFL (Colleges and Universities Football League), Collingwood Cup and Harding Cup (Freshers). 

The campus is home to a wide range of sport facilities. Facilities include Dangan Sportsground, where the university's GAA teams compete, and the Kingfisher, where Moycullen Basketball Club play their games.

Connacht Rugby
In 2013, the university announced it would sponsor Connacht Rugby, the nearby professional Pro12 (now URC) rugby union team, for the following three years and would put in place a "High Performance Education Partnership" that would give players from the Connacht Rugby Academy and age-grade teams the chance to educated there. At the time of the announcement 17 members of Connacht's squad were either attending the university as students or were graduates.

Within a few years of the start of the university's sponsorship of the Connacht Rugby Academy, the team had won, what was then the 2015–16 Pro12 title, for the first time by defeating Leinster in the 2016 Pro12 Grand Final. Seven players from the Connacht Rugby Academy played 55 times for their team during that campaign, with others in that squad also graduates of the Connacht Rugby Academy.

The deal was renewed in 2017, covering the period until 2019.

Students' Union

The Students' Union's primary role is to provide a recognised representative channel between undergraduates and the university and college authorities. The president-elect for the 2022–2023 academic year is Sai Gujulla.

In February 2009, the university announced the Students' Union-run RAG week would "no longer form part of the university calendar". The President of the Students' Union expressed the belief that the decision was unjustified, citing the more than €20,000 raised for charities that year.

International
International students make up over 12 percent of the student population at the University of Galway.

People

Presidents

Notable alumni
 Aifric Keogh and Fiona Murtagh Olympic bronze medalists Tokyo 2020
 Michael D. Higgins, 9th President of Ireland
 Enda Kenny, former Taoiseach
 Mark Heslin, judge of the High Court
 Máire Whelan, former Attorney General and current judge of the Court of Appeal
 Breandán Ó hEithir, writer and author
 Conor Pope, journalist
 Pat McGrath, news correspondent
 Gráinne Seoige, news anchor
 Keith Barry, performing artist
 Martin Sheen, actor

Notable faculty
Emily Anderson - first professor of German
Nicholas Canny - historian
 Colm McDonald - professor of psychiatry
 Michael D. Higgins - sociologist, 9th President of Ireland
 William King - geologist
Alice Perry - engineer
Gerard Quinn - jurist, specialised in international and comparative disability law and policy.
 Niamh Reilly - sociologist and political scientist
George Johnstone Stoney - physicist

In literature and other media
University of Galway is the setting for, and is referred to in, numerous works of fiction.

Breandán Ó hEithir's novel Lig Sinn i gCathú, set in a thinly disguised Galway and telling the story of student life over four days in April 1949, has featured on the secondary school Leaving Certificate syllabus.

Tom Curtin's novel Melting Pot: An Irish Odyssey tells the story of three lads from University College Galway who leave Ireland for New York in 1969.

The university has also faced the legal consequences of gender inequality after a number of female lecturers starting proceedings against the university as gender as a grounds of discrimination is prohibited by Irish law.

Rankings and reputation

University of Galway has been awarded the full five QS stars for excellence, and is ranked among the top 1 per cent of universities according to the 2018 QS World University Rankings. These rankings marked the sixth consecutive year that the university's ranking improved by these standards.

In 2016 and 2017, the university was ranked ahead of University College Dublin (UCD) and Queen's University Belfast (QUB) in the Academic Ranking of World Universities (ARWU), placing it second among Irish universities — behind only Trinity College Dublin (TCD). Likewise, in the Times Higher Education World University Rankings, Galway was ranked ahead of UCD and behind only TCD.

The Sunday Times University Guide has named the university as its "University of the Year" on three occasions. It won the Times's inaugural title in 2002–2003. A second title followed in 2009–2010. Galway won its third title in 2018.

See also
 Education in the Republic of Ireland
 List of universities in the Republic of Ireland

References

External links

 Official website

 
1845 establishments in Ireland
Galway
Education in County Galway
Galway
Galway